The Janata Party (Secular) was an Indian political party founded by Raj Narain in July, 1979. On 16 July 1979, Charan Singh assumed its leadership and became the Prime Minister of India on 28 July 1979 with the support of the Indian National Congress (I) but resigned on 20 August 1979 after their withdrawal of support. The Janata Party led by Charan Singh was later renamed as Lok Dal before the 1980 Indian general election but officially contested in the elections under its previous name. In the elections for the 7th Lok Sabha in 1980, the party won 41 seats and received 9.39% of the total votes polled.

See also
 Janata Party
 Lok Dal

Notes

Defunct political parties in India
Political parties established in 1979
1979 establishments in India
Political parties with year of disestablishment missing
Janata Party (Secular)